Kavanur is a village in the Ariyalur taluk of Ariyalur district, Tamil Nadu, India.

References 

Villages in Ariyalur district